Vladimir Vasilyevich Shcherbakov (1909–1985) was a Soviet economist and politician, Rector (director) of the Moscow Institute of Finance (1953–1985), PhD in Economics, professor, member of the Supreme Council of the USSR of the 3rd convocation (1950–1954).

Biography 
Shcherbakov was born in 1909 in Yuzovka (now Donetsk, Ukraine). In 1930, he graduated from Kharkov Engineering and Economic Institute. From 1931 to 1935 he attended graduate school at the institute. From 1935 to 1938 he served at the Department of Political Economy, and since 1938 – as Associate Professor at the Kharkov Polytechnic Institute.

Since 1939 he served as a political worker – Secretary of the Kharkov Regional Committee of the Komsomol, then as Deputy Head of the Propaganda and Agitation Department of the Komsomol Central Committee in Moscow.

In 1942–1943 – Deputy Head of the Political Administration of the Soviet Union's People's Commissariat for Agriculture.

From 1943 to 1946 he served as Deputy Head of the Personnel Department of the Central Committee of the All-Union Communist Party (Bolsheviks).

From March 1946 to June 1947 – Chairman of the Bureau of the Central Committee of the All-Union Communist Party of Bolsheviks in Lithuanian Soviet Socialist Republic.

From June 1947 to July 1951 – First Secretary of the Kaliningrad Regional Committee of the All-Union Communist Party (Bolsheviks).

From July 1951 to July 1953 he worked as Deputy Minister of Cinematography of the USSR.

In August 1953, he became Director, later Rector of the Moscow Institute of Finance (now Financial University under the Government of the Russian Federation) and headed the University until his death in 1985.

Since 1967, Shcherbakov was a professor at the Department of Political Economy and a member of the Editorial Board of the “Bulletin of Higher School”. During his work as a Rector, Shcherbakov is recognized as talented organizer and a decisive administrator. Under his leadership, Moscow Institute of Finance has become a leading financial and economic university in the country.

While in that office, he was a member of the Supreme Soviet of the Soviet Union, 3rd convocation (1950–1954).

Honors and awards 
 Order of Lenin (1947)
 Order of the Patriotic War, 2nd class
 Order of the Patriotic War, 1st class (1945)
 2 Orders of the Red Banner of Labor

References

External links
  

1909 births
1985 deaths
Soviet economists
Rectors of the Financial University under the Government of the Russian Federation
Recipients of the Order of Lenin